Planter's punch is an IBA Official Cocktail made of Jamaican rum, fresh lime juice, and sugar cane juice.

The cocktail has been said to have originated at the Planters Hotel in Charleston, South Carolina, but actually originated in Jamaica. The September 1878 issue of the London magazine Fun listed the recipe as follows:

References 

Cocktails with rum
Tiki drinks
Sweet cocktails
Sour cocktails
Mixed drinks
Limes (fruit)